Agatasa is a butterfly genus in the brush-footed butterflies family (Nymphalidae). It is monotypic, containing only Agatasa calydonia, the glorious begum, which is found from southern Burma, through the Thai-Malay Peninsula, to Borneo, Sumatra and the Philippines.

References

 

Charaxinae
Butterflies of Asia
Butterflies of Borneo
Butterflies of Indochina
Monotypic butterfly genera
Nymphalidae genera